Andrew Iain Lewer  (born 18 July 1971 in Burnley, Lancashire) is a British Conservative Party politician. Elected as the Member of Parliament for Northampton South in the 2017 general election, he previously served as Member of the European Parliament for the East Midlands from 2014 to 2017. He is the only person in the UK to have served as a Council Leader, MEP and MP.

He chairs the All Party Parliamentary Groups on Motor Neurone Disease, Venezuela, Independent Education, Devolution, Publishing, and SME Housebuilding, and is a member of both the Education and Levelling Up, Housing and Communities Select Committees.

Early life and career
Lewer was born 18 July 1971 in Burnley, Lancashire. He attended Queen Elizabeth's Grammar School in Ashbourne, Derbyshire before studying history at Newcastle University. He then entered into a career in publishing.

Living in Derbyshire, he was elected as a Conservative Party Councillor to Derbyshire Dales District Council for the Ashbourne South ward in 2003 and then to Derbyshire County Council for the Ashbourne division in 2005. He became Group Leader in 2007. The Conservatives took control of Derbyshire County Council in 2009, for the first time in 28 years, making Lewer the youngest county council leader in the country at the time. As Leader of the County Council, he also became Chairman of the Derwent Valley Mills World Heritage Site committee, the founding Chairman of the Health and Wellbeing Board and a founding director of the Local Enterprise Partnership for Derbyshire and Nottinghamshire – D2N2.

Although he was re-elected as a councillor, in the 2013 elections Labour regained control of Derbyshire County Council and Lewer lost his position as Council Leader. He was awarded an MBE for services to local government in 2014. At the conclusion of his four-year term of office as Leader of Derbyshire County Council, Andrew Lewer became vice-president of the Local Government Association (LGA), a position he retains to this day.

Member of the European Parliament 
Lewer was elected to the European Parliament representing the East Midlands in 2014, replacing the former Conservative MEP Roger Helmer, who had defected to UKIP. Lewer was appointed to the Regional Development Committee and the Culture Committee as spokesperson for the European Conservative and Reformists Group in 2014. He supported the UK leaving the EU, feeling David Cameron had failed to gain any meaningful concessions from his European counterparts.

Member of Parliament 
In May 2017, Lewer was selected to run as the new Conservative Party candidate for the Northampton South parliamentary constituency after the sitting Conservative MP David Mackintosh stood down. Lewer was reportedly on his way to Brussels when he took a call informing him he was shortlisted, and had to turn around to get back in time for the meeting. Although not from Northampton, Lewer represented Northamptonshire within his East Midlands region as an MEP.

Lewer was subsequently elected Member of Parliament for Northampton South in the 2017 general election. Following his election win, he stood down as an MEP and was replaced in that role by former author Rupert Matthews.  He retained his seat at the 2019 general election with an increased majority.

In March 2018, Lewer was criticised by local campaigners over cuts to library services in Northampton. Lewer responded that he had been far from silent on the issue and that he had been a long-standing critic of the leadership of the council.

IIn February 2018, following the announcement that Northamptonshire County Council had brought in a section 114 notice, putting it in special measures following a crisis in its finances, Lewer was one of seven local MPs who released a statement expressing 'no confidence' in the council's leadership. In August 2018, Lewer broke ranks with the other MPs and said that while mismanagement had fuelled the Northamptonshire crisis, the council was also a victim of underlying financial pressures affecting all local authorities with social care responsibilities.

In Parliament, he served on the European Scrutiny Committee and the Housing, Communities and Local Government Committee, during his first mandate.

During the meaningful vote period, Andrew Lewer voted against the Government twice before voting for it a third time when faced with Theresa May reneging on her commitment to take the UK out of the EU on 29 March 2019. During the subsequent Leadership election, Andrew Lewer supported Esther McVey and then Boris Johnson Following the 2019 General Election, Andrew Lewer was appointed Parliamentary Private Secretary (PPS) to the Home Office, having previously served after Boris Johnson was elected as PPS to the Northern Ireland Office, the Wales Office and the Scotland Office.

Following an interim report on the connections between colonialism and properties now in the care of the National Trust, including links with historic slavery, Lewer was among the signatories of a letter to The Telegraph in November 2020 from the "Common Sense Group" of Conservative Parliamentarians. The letter accused the National Trust of being "coloured by cultural Marxist dogma, colloquially known as the 'woke agenda'".

In December 2020 Lewer was fired from his PPS post for supposedly leaking information to the press, although no evidence linking Lewer to the leak was produced. Lewer said at the time "in nearly 20 years of elected office I have never leaked to the press". Six weeks later, Lewer was re-elected as a Member of Levelling Up, Housing and Communities Select Committee.

In January 2021 Lewer wrote an open letter to the Northamptonshire Chief Constable asking that the Police do not focus on 'soft targets' for Covid fines.

In November 2021, as Chair of the All-Party Parliamentary Group on Motor Neurone Disease, Lewer welcomed the fulfilment of the Group's 'United to End MND' campaign with the Government's commitment of £50 million towards the establishment of a Motor Neurone Disease Research Institute.

In December 2021 Lewer backed the campaign to build a monument to commemorate the efforts of the Photographic Reconnaissance Unit, a former pilot of which, George Pritchard, lives in his Northampton South constituency.

During the July 2022 Conservative Party leadership election, Lewer helped form the campaign team of Kemi Badenoch, who reached the fourth ballot of Conservative MPs, garnering 59 votes.

In October 2022, Andrew Lewer was elected unopposed to the Education Select Committee. Since his appointment he has questioned Secretary of State Rt Hon Gillian Keegan MP about her lack of support for new grammar schools but supported her defence of not levying VAT on independent school fees.

Personal life 
Lewer is married and has a young son. He is an honorary Alderman of the county of Derbyshire, where he was based before being elected as an MP.

References

External links

1971 births
Living people
Conservative Party (UK) councillors
Conservative Party (UK) MPs for English constituencies
Conservative Party (UK) MEPs
MEPs for England 2014–2019
People from Burnley
Members of the Order of the British Empire
UK MPs 2017–2019
UK MPs 2019–present
Leaders of local authorities of England